Ljiljana Ranković (born  in Valjevo) is a Serbian volleyball player. She played for the Serbia women's national volleyball team.

Ranković joined the OK Vizura Belgrade when she was only 14, and has won three national titles with the club. She only spent the 2014/15 season on a loan with the Smeč 5 from Kragujevac, recovering from an injury and helping them establish themselves in the national league. She stayed with Vizura until 2016. As the team captain, she led Vizura in the 2016 victory in the national cup and was named MVP of the season for the 2015/16 season. For the 2016/17 season, she signed for French side ESCR from Le Cannet where she finished the 2016-2017 season as runner-up in the French championship.
For the 2017/18 season, she signed for RC Cannes.

In the junior national teams, Ranković has won a silver at both Cadet and Junior European Championships, as well as a silver on the World Junior Championships in Thailand, won by Brazil. She played for the national team at the 2015 World Grand Prix.

Sporting achievements

Clubs

National championships
 2015/2016  Serbian Championship, with Vizura Beograd
 2016/2017  French Championship, with ESCR Le Cannet
 2017/2018  French Cup, with RC Cannes
 2017/2018  French Championship, with RC Cannes

National team
  Cadet European Championship
  Junior European Championship
  World Junior Championships

References

1993 births
Living people
Serbian women's volleyball players
Sportspeople from Valjevo
Serbian expatriate sportspeople in France
21st-century Serbian women